Patnam Subramania Iyer (1845 – July 31, 1902) was a composer and singer of Carnatic music. Subramaniya Iyer followed the traditions of the great composer Tyagaraja. He has left behind almost one hundred compositions.

Subramaniya Iyer was born in Thiruvaiyaru in Thanjavur district of present-day Tamil Nadu. His family had a long history of musical involvement – his father Bharatam Vaidyanatha Iyer was adept at both music and Sastra and his grandfather Panchanada Sastri was the court musician in the court of Serfoji Maharaja of Thanjavur. Subramaniya Iyer learned music from his uncle, Melattur Ganapati Sastri, and later under Manambuchavadi Venkatasubbayyar who was a disciple of Tyagaraja himself.

Subramaniya Iyer spent a long time in Chennapatnam (Chennai). This gave Subramaniya Iyer the prefix to his name. Many of his students such as Mysore Vasudevachar, Poochi Srinivasa Iyengar, Bhairavi Kempegowda and Tiger Varadachariar became famous composers and vocalists. His neighbour Maha Vaidyanatha Iyer was also a noted musician. 

Two of his famous compositions are Raghu Vamsha Sudha in raga Kathanakuthuhalam and Evari Bodhanna in raga Abhogi. He is known to have used his guru's mudra (signature) Venkatesa or variations of the same, in his compositions in Telugu and Sanskrit.

The reigning Maharaja of Mysore, Chamarajendra Wodeyar X, gave him a pair of golden bracelets on two occasions, after singing performances in court.

Music compositions

Varnams 

maravakavE O manasaa || Shyaamaa || || Telugu

Krithis

See also 

 List of Carnatic composers

Notes

References 
 Musical Nirvana biography
 Creativity at its best, The Hindu, 04-Oct-2002

1845 births
1902 deaths
20th-century Indian musicians
Carnatic composers